The following outline is provided as an overview of and topical guide to the United Nations:

United Nations – international organization whose stated aims are facilitating cooperation in international law, international security, economic development, social progress, human rights, and achievement of world peace. The UN was founded in 1945 after World War II to replace the League of Nations, to stop wars between countries, and to provide a platform for dialogue. It contains multiple subsidiary organizations to carry out its missions.

Legal foundation: The United Nations Charter
 United Nations Charter – foundational treaty of the United Nations which states that obligations to the United Nations prevail over all other treaty obligations and is binding for all United Nations members.
 Type of document: treaty
 Signed: 26 June 1945
 Location: San Francisco, California, United States
 Effective: 24 October 1945
 Condition: Ratification by China, France, the Soviet Union, the United Kingdom, United States and by a majority of the other signatory states.
 Parties: 193
 Sections: 20 (the preamble and 19 chapters)
 Preamble to the United Nations Charter – opening (preamble) of the United Nations Charter.
 Chapter I: Purposes And Principles – lays out the purposes and principles of the United Nations organization.
 Chapter II: Membership
 Chapter III: Organs
 Chapter IV: The General Assembly
 Chapter V: The Security Council
 Chapter VI: Pacific Settlement of Disputes
 Chapter VII: Action with respect to Threats to the Peace, Breaches of the Peace, and Acts of Aggression
 Chapter VIII: Regional Arrangements
 Chapter IX: International Economic and Social Co-operation
 Chapter X: The Economic and Social Council
 Chapter XI: Declaration regarding Non-Self-Governing Territories
 Chapter XII: International Trusteeship System
 Chapter XIII: The Trusteeship System
 Chapter XIV: The International Court of Justice
 Chapter XV: The Secretariat
 Chapter XVI: Miscellaneous Provisions
 Chapter XVII: Transitional Security Arrangements
 Chapter XVIII: Amendments
 Chapter XIX: Ratification and Signature

Membership
 Member states of the United Nations

United Nations System 

 United Nations System

Core structure of the United Nations

General Assembly
 United Nations General Assembly
 Main Committees
 The First Committee: Disarmament and International Security (DISEC)
 The Second Committee: Economic and Financial (ECOFIN)
 The Third Committee: Social, Cultural, and Humanitarian (SOCHUM)
 The Fourth Committee: Special Political and Decolonisation (SPECPOL)
 The Fifth Committee: Administrative and Budgetary
 The Sixth Committee: Legal.
 Other committees and subsidiary bodies
 Peacebuilding Commission (also reports to the Security Council)
 Human Rights Council

Security Council
 United Nations Security Council
 Subsidiary bodies
 Military Staff Committee
 Peacebuilding Commission (also reports to the General Assembly)
 Sanctions committees
 International criminal tribunals
 International Criminal Tribunal for the Former Yugoslavia
 International Criminal Tribunal for Rwanda

Economic and Social Council

United Nations Economic and Social Council
 Functional Commissions
 Commission for Social Development 
 Commission on Narcotic Drugs 
 International Narcotics Control Board
 Commission on Crime Prevention and Criminal Justice 
 Commission on Science and Technology for Development 
 Commission on Sustainable Development 
 Commission on the Status of Women 
 Commission on Population and Development 
 Statistical Commission 
 United Nations Forum on Forests 
 Regional Commissions
 United Nations Economic Commission for Europe (ECE)
 United Nations Economic Commission for Africa (ECA)
 United Nations Economic Commission for Latin America and the Caribbean (ECLAC)
 United Nations Economic and Social Commission for Asia and the Pacific (ESCAP)
 United Nations Economic and Social Commission for Western Asia (ESCWA)

United Nations Secretariat
 United Nations Secretariat
 Commission on Population and Development
 United Nations Deputy Secretary-General
 Microcredit
 Nafis Sadik
 Rafael M. Salas
 Jomo Kwame Sundaram
 Under-Secretary-General of the United Nations
 United Nations Economic and Social Commission for Asia and the Pacific
 United Nations Economic and Social Commission for Western Asia
 United Nations Permanent Forum on Indigenous Issues
 United Nations Secretariat
 United Nations Secretary-General
 United Nations Statistical Commission

United Nations Secretariat offices 
 Office of Legal Affairs (OLA) 
 Office of Internal Oversight Services (OIOS) 
 Office for Disarmament Affairs (ODA)
 Office for the Coordination of Humanitarian Affairs (OCHA)
 Office of the United Nations High Commissioner for Human Rights (OHCHR)

United Nations Secretariat departments 
 Department of Political and Peacebuilding Affairs (DPPA) 
 Special political missions
 Department of Peace Operations (DPO) 
 Peacekeeping operations
 Department of Field Support (DFS) 
 Department of Management (DM)
 Department of Economic and Social Affairs (DESA)
 Department of General Assembly and Conference Management (DGACM)
 Department of Public Information (DPI)

International Court of Justice 
 International Court of Justice
 Jurisdiction of the International Court of Justice
 Leonid Skotnikov

International Court of Justice cases
 Bosnian genocide case at the International Court of Justice
 International Court of Justice advisory opinion on the Legality of the Threat or Use of Nuclear Weapons
 International Court of Justice advisory opinion on the Legality of the Use by a State of Nuclear Weapons in Armed Conflict
 List of International Court of Justice cases
 LaGrand case
 Nicaragua v. United States
 Lotus case

International Court of Justice judges
 Ronny Abraham
 Awn Shawkat Al-Khasawneh
 Thomas Buergenthal
 John Dugard
 Nabil Elaraby
 Taslim Olawale Elias
 Rosalyn Higgins
 Robert Yewdall Jennings
 Philip Jessup
 Eduardo Jimenez de Arechaga
 Kenneth Keith
 Muhammad Zafrulla Khan
 Pieter Kooijmans
 Abdul G. Koroma
 Manfred Lachs
 Nagendra Singh
 Shigeru Oda
 Hisashi Owada
 Gonzalo Parra Aranguren
 Raymond Ranjeva
 John Erskine Read
 Francisco Rezek
 Jose Maria Ruda
 Stephen M. Schwebel
 Bernardo Sepúlveda Amor
 Shi Jiuyong
 Bruno Simma
 Peter Tomka
 Humphrey Waldock
 Christopher Weeramantry

Trusteeship Council

United Nations Trusteeship Council

Funds and programmes, research and training institutes, and other bodies

Funds and programmes
 International Trade Centre (ITC)
 Office of the United Nations High Commissioner for Refugees (OHCHR)
 United Nations Children's Fund (UNICEF)
 United Nations Conference on Trade and Development (UNCTAD)
 United Nations Development Programme (UNDP)
 United Nations Capital Development Fund (UNCDF)
 United Nations Volunteers (UNV)
 United Nations Environment Programme (UNEP)
 United Nations Human Settlements Programme (UN-HABITAT)
 United Nations Office on Drugs and Crime (UNODC)
 United Nations Population Fund (UNFPA)
 United Nations Relief and Works Agency for Palestine Refugees in the Near East (UNRWA)
 World Food Programme (WFP)

Research and training institutes
 United Nations Institute for Disarmament Research (UNIDIR)
 United Nations Institute for Training and Research (UNITAR)
 United Nations Interregional Crime and Justice Research Institute (UNICRI)
 United Nations Research Institute for Social Development (UNRISD)

Secretariats of Conventions
 Convention on the Rights of Persons with Disabilities
 UNCCD – United Nations Convention to Combat Desertification
 UNFCCC – United Nations Framework Convention on Climate Change
 UNCLOS – United Nations Convention on the Law of the Sea established bodies:
 ISA – International Seabed Authority
 ITLOS – International Tribunal for the Law of the Sea

Other entities
 Joint United Nations Programme on HIV/AIDS (UNAIDS)
 United Nations Entity for Gender Equality and the Empowerment of Women (UN Women)
 United Nations Office for Project Services (UNOPS)
 United Nations System Staff College (UNSSC)
 United Nations University (UNU)

Specialized agencies

Specialized agencies of the United Nations – autonomous organizations working with the United Nations and each other through the coordinating machinery of the Economic and Social Council.
 International Labour Organization (ILO)
 Food and Agriculture Organization (FAO)
 United Nations Educational, Scientific and Cultural Organization (UNESCO)
 World Health Organization (WHO)
 World Bank Group
 International Bank for Reconstruction and Development(IBRD)
 International Development Association (IDA)
 International Finance Corporation (IFC)
 Multilateral Investment Guarantee Agency (MIGA)
 International Centre for Settlement of Investment Disputes (ICSID)
 International Monetary Fund (IMF)
 International Civil Aviation Organization ICAO
 International Maritime Organization (IMO)
 International Telecommunication Union (ITU)
 Universal Postal Union (UPU)
 World Meteorological Organization (WMO)
 World Intellectual Property Organization (WIPO)
 International Fund for Agricultural Development (IFAD)
 United Nations Industrial Development Organization (UNIDO)
 World Tourism Organization (UNWTO)
 International Refugee Organization (IRO); ceased to exist in 1952

International Civil Aviation Organization
 International Civil Aviation Organization
 Kenneth Beaumont
 Convention on International Civil Aviation
 ICAO airline designator
 ICAO airport code
 Assad Kotaite
 Shivinder Singh Sidhu
 Edward Pearson Warner

ICAO airline designator
 Airline call sign
 ICAO airline designator
 International Civil Aviation Organization

ICAO airport designator
 List of airports by ICAO code
 List of airports by ICAO code: A
 List of airports by ICAO code: B
 List of airports by ICAO code: C
 List of airports by ICAO code: CA
 List of airports by ICAO code: CB
 List of airports by ICAO code: CC
 List of airports by ICAO code: CD
 List of airports by ICAO code: CE
 List of airports by ICAO code: CF
 List of airports by ICAO code: CG
 List of airports by ICAO code: CH
 List of airports by ICAO code: CI
 List of airports by ICAO code: CJ
 List of airports by ICAO code: CK
 List of airports by ICAO code: CL
 List of airports by ICAO code: CM
 List of airports by ICAO code: CN
 List of airports by ICAO code: CO
 List of airports by ICAO code: CP
 List of airports by ICAO code: CR
 List of airports by ICAO code: CS
 List of airports by ICAO code: CT
 List of airports by ICAO code: CV
 List of airports by ICAO code: CW
 List of airports by ICAO code: CY
 List of airports by ICAO code: CZ
 List of airports by ICAO code: D
 List of airports by ICAO code: E
 List of airports by ICAO code: F
 List of airports by ICAO code: G
 List of airports by ICAO code: H
 List of airports by ICAO code: I
 List of airports by ICAO code: J
 List of airports by ICAO code: K
 List of airports by ICAO code: L
 List of airports by ICAO code: M
 List of airports by ICAO code: N
 List of airports by ICAO code: O
 List of airports by ICAO code: P
 List of airports by ICAO code: Q
 List of airports by ICAO code: R
 List of airports by ICAO code: S
 List of airports by ICAO code: T
 List of airports by ICAO code: U
 List of airports by ICAO code: V
 List of airports by ICAO code: W
 List of airports by ICAO code: X
 List of airports by ICAO code: Y
 List of airports by ICAO code: Z

International Monetary Fund
 Annual Meetings of the International Monetary Fund and the World Bank Group
 International Financial Statistics
 International Monetary Fund
 Life and Debt
 Raymond Mikesell
 Singapore 2006
 Special drawing rights
 United Nations Monetary and Financial Conference

Managing directors of the International Monetary Fund
 Michel Camdessus
 Camille Gutt
 Ivar Rooth
 Per Jacobsson
 Horst Köhler
 Anne O. Krueger
 Jacques de Larosière
 Rodrigo Rato
 Pierre-Paul Schweitzer
 H. Johannes Witteveen

International Telecommunication Union
 International Telecommunication Union
 ITU-D
 ITU-R
 Radio Regulations
 Regional Radiocommunication Conference
 ITU region
 ITU-T
 ITU Youth Forum
 Tunis Agenda for the Information Society
 Tunis Commitment
 Video Coding Experts Group
 World Information Society Day
 World Radiocommunication Conference
 World Summit on the Information Society

ITU-R recommendations
 CCIR 601
 Coordinated Universal Time
 Error Detection and Handling
 ITU-R 468 noise weighting
 ITU-R BS.1534-1
 ITU-R BT.1304
 ITU-R BT.470-6
 ITU-R BT.470-7
 ITU-R BT.601
 ITU-R BT.656
 ITU-R M.824
 ITU-R TF.460-4
 ITU656
 MUSHRA
 NTSC
 PAL
 Racon
 Serial Digital Interface
 Standard:ITU-R 468

ITU-T recommendations
 ATM Adaptation Layers
 Abstract Syntax Notation One
 Allowed cell rate
 Asymmetric Digital Subscriber Line
 Asynchronous Transfer Mode
 Basic Encoding Rules
 Broadband Integrated Services Digital Network
 CHILL
 CLNS
 Canonical Encoding Rules
 Common Management Information Protocol
 DOCSIS
 Distinguished Encoding Rules
 E.123
 E.163
 E.164
 E.214
 FTAM
 Fax
 G.114
 G.165
 G.703
 G.709
 G.711
 G.722
 G.722.1
 AMR-WB
 G.723
 G.723.1
 G.726
 G.728
 G.729
 G.729a
 G.983
 G.984
 ITU G.991.2
 GDMO
 Generic Framing Procedure
 H.225.0
 H.235
 H.239
 H.245
 H.248
 H.261
 H.262
 H.263
 H.264/MPEG-4 AVC
 H.320
 H.323
 H.324
 H.450
 ITU G.992.1
 ITU G.992.2
 ITU G.992.3/4
 ITU G.992.5
 ITU-T V-Series Recommendations
 Integrated Services Digital Network
 Intelligent Network
 JBIG
 LCAS
 List of devices that support H.264/MPEG-4 AVC
 List of mobile country codes
 MML (language)
 Megaco
 Mobile Station Integrated Services Digital Network
 Mu-law algorithm
 Numbering plan
 OSI model
 Open Document Architecture
 Open Document Interchange Format
 Open Systems Interconnection
 Packed Encoding Rules
 Packet Layer Protocol
 Public switched telephone network
 Q.931
 R interface
 Registration, Admission and Status
 Remote Operations Service Element protocol
 S interface
 Signalling Connection Control Part
 Signaling System 7
 Specification and Description Language
 Symmetric High-speed Digital Subscriber Line
 T.120
 T.37
 T.38
 T.50
 T.61
 T.82
 TTCN
 Telecommunications Management Network
 Teletex
 Transaction Capabilities Application Part
 U interface
 Up0-interface
 V.24
 V.92
 Very-high-bit-rate Digital Subscriber Line 2
 Virtual terminal
 X.121
 X.21
 X.25
 X.400
 X.500
 X.509
 XML Encoding Rules

International Labour Organization
 Marc Bélanger
 International Labour Conference
 Declaration of Philadelphia
 International Labour Organization
 International Labour Organization/Summary
 International Standard Classification of Occupations
 David A. Morse
 Pilot Project on CSEC, Child Trafficking and educational rehabilitation
 International Programme on the Elimination of Child Labour
 International labour standards
 Time-bound programmes for the eradication of the worst forms of child labour
 Wikipedia:WikiProject Organized Labour/Internationalisation

International Labour Organization Conventions
 Accommodation of Crews (Fishermen) Convention, 1966
 Accommodation of Crews (Supplementary Provisions) Convention, 1970
 Accommodation of Crews Convention (Revised), 1949
 Accommodation of Crews Convention, 1946
 Asbestos Convention, 1986
 Benzene Convention, 1971
 Certification of Able Seamen Convention, 1946
 Certification of Ships' Cooks Convention, 1946
 Collective Bargaining Convention, 1981
 Continuity of Employment (Seafarers) Convention, 1976
 Contracts of Employment (Indigenous Workers) Convention, 1939 (shelved)
 Contracts of Employment (Indigenous Workers) Convention, 1947 (shelved)
 Convention concerning Statistics of Wages and Hours of Work, 1938
 Discrimination (Employment and Occupation) Convention, 1958
 Dock Work Convention, 1973
 Employment Policy Convention, 1964
 Employment Promotion and Protection against Unemployment Convention, 1988
 Employment Service Convention, 1948
 Equal Remuneration Convention, 1951
 Equality of Treatment (Accident Compensation) Convention, 1925
 Equality of Treatment (Social Security) Convention, 1962
 Medical Examination of Young Persons (Sea) Convention, 1921
 Fee-Charging Employment Agencies Convention (Revised), 1949
 Fee-Charging Employment Agencies Convention, 1933 (shelved)
 Final Articles Revision Convention, 1946
 Final Articles Revision Convention, 1961
 Fishermen's Articles of Agreement Convention, 1959
 Fishermen's Competency Certificates Convention, 1966
 Food and Catering (Ships' Crews) Convention, 1946
 Forced Labour Convention, 1930
 Forty-Hour Week Convention, 1935
 Freedom of Association and Protection of the Right to Organise Convention, 1948
 Guarding of Machinery Convention, 1963
 Health Protection and Medical Care (Seafarers) Convention, 1987
 Holidays with Pay (Agriculture) Convention, 1952
 Holidays with Pay (Sea) Convention, 1936
 Holidays with Pay Convention (Revised), 1970
 Holidays with Pay Convention, 1936
 Home Work Convention, 1996
 Hours of Work (Industry) Convention, 1919
 Hours of Work (Coal Mines) Convention (Revised), 1935
 Hours of Work (Coal Mines) Convention, 1931
 Hours of Work (Commerce and Offices) Convention, 1930
 Hours of Work and Manning (Sea) Convention, 1936
 Hours of Work and Rest Periods (Road Transport) Convention, 1979
 Human Resources Development Convention, 1975
 Hygiene (Commerce and Offices) Convention, 1964
 ILO Convention
 Inspection of Emigrants Convention, 1926 (shelved)
 Employment Injury Benefits Convention, 1964
 Invalidity Insurance (Agriculture) Convention, 1933 (shelved)
 Invalidity Insurance (Industry, etc.) Convention, 1933 (shelved)
 Invalidity, Old-Age and Survivors' Benefits Convention, 1967
 Labour Administration Convention, 1978
 Labour Clauses (Public Contracts) Convention, 1949
 Labour Inspection (Agriculture) Convention, 1969
 Labour Inspection (Seafarers) Convention, 1996
 Labour Inspection Convention, 1947
 Labour Inspectorates (Non-Metropolitan Territories) Convention, 1947
 Labour Relations (Public Service) Convention, 1978
 Labour Standards (Non-Metropolitan Territories) Convention, 1947
 Labour Statistics Convention, 1985
 Maintenance of Migrants' Pension Rights Convention, 1935 (shelved)
 Maintenance of Social Security Rights Convention, 1982
 Marking of Weight (Packages Transported by Vessels) Convention, 1929
 Maternity Protection Convention, 1919
 Maternity Protection Convention (Revised), 1952
 Maternity Protection Convention, 2000
 Abolition of Penal Sanctions (Indigenous Workers) Convention, 1955 (shelved)
 Abolition of Forced Labour Convention, 1957
 Weekly Rest (Commerce and Offices) Convention, 1957
 Indigenous and Tribal Populations Convention, 1957
 Seafarers' Identity Documents Convention, 1958
 Seafarers' Identity Documents Convention (Revised), 2003
 Chemicals Convention, 1990
 Night Work Convention, 1990
 Working Conditions (Hotels and Restaurants) Convention, 1991
 Safety and Health in Agriculture Convention, 2001
 Maximum Weight Convention, 1967
 Medical Care and Sickness Benefits Convention, 1969
 Medical Examination (Fishermen) Convention, 1959
 Medical Examination (Seafarers) Convention, 1946
 Medical Examination of Young Persons (Non-Industrial Occupations) Convention, 1946
 Medical Examination of Young Persons (Underground Work) Convention, 1965
 Merchant Shipping (Minimum Standards) Convention, 1976
 Migrant Workers (Supplementary Provisions) Convention, 1975
 Migration for Employment Convention (Revised), 1949
 Migration for Employment Convention, 1939
 Minimum Age (Industry) Convention, 1919
 Minimum Age (Sea) Convention, 1920
 Minimum Age (Agriculture) Convention, 1921
 Minimum Age (Sea) Convention (Revised), 1936
 Minimum Age (Industry) Convention (Revised), 1937
 Minimum Age (Fishermen) Convention, 1959
 Minimum Age (Non-Industrial Employment) Convention (Revised), 1937 (shelved)
 Minimum Age (Non-Industrial Employment) Convention, 1932
 Minimum Age (Underground Work) Convention, 1965
 Minimum Age Convention, 1973
 Minimum Wage Fixing Convention, 1970
 Minimum Wage Fixing Machinery (Agriculture) Convention, 1951
 Minimum Wage-Fixing Machinery Convention, 1928
 Night Work (Women) Convention, 1919 (shelved)
 Night Work of Young Persons (Industry) Convention, 1919
 Night Work (Bakeries) Convention, 1925 (shelved)
 Night Work of Young Persons (Industry) Convention (Revised), 1948
 Night Work (Women) Convention (Revised), 1934 (shelved)
 Night Work (Women) Convention (Revised), 1948
 Night Work of Young Persons (Non-Industrial Occupations) Convention, 1946
 Nursing Personnel Convention, 1977
 Occupational Cancer Convention, 1974
 Occupational Health Services Convention, 1985
 Occupational Safety and Health (Dock Work) Convention, 1979
 Occupational Safety and Health Convention, 1981
 Officers' Competency Certificates Convention, 1936
 Old-Age Insurance (Agriculture) Convention, 1933 (shelved)
 Old-Age Insurance (Industry, etc.) Convention, 1933 (shelved)
 Paid Educational Leave Convention, 1974
 Paid Vacations (Seafarers) Convention (Revised), 1949 (shelved)
 Paid Vacations (Seafarers) Convention, 1946
 Part-Time Work Convention, 1994
 Penal Sanctions (Indigenous Workers) Convention, 1939 (shelved)
 Placing of Seamen Convention, 1920
 Plantations Convention, 1958
 Prevention of Accidents (Seafarers) Convention, 1970
 Prevention of Major Industrial Accidents Convention, 1993
 Private Employment Agencies Convention, 1997
 Protection against Accidents (Dockers) Convention (Revised), 1932
 Protection against Accidents (Dockers) Convention, 1929 (shelved)
 Protection of Wages Convention, 1949
 Protection of Workers' Claims (Employer's Insolvency) Convention, 1992
 Radiation Protection Convention, 1960
 Recruiting of Indigenous Workers Convention, 1936 (shelved)
 Recruitment and Placement of Seafarers Convention, 1996
 Reduction of Hours of Work (Glass-Bottle Works) Convention, 1935 (shelved)
 Reduction of Hours of Work (Public Works) Convention, 1936
 Reduction of Hours of Work (Textiles) Convention, 1937
 Repatriation of Seafarers Convention (Revised), 1987
 Repatriation of Seamen Convention, 1926
 Right of Association (Agriculture) Convention, 1921
 Right of Association (Non-Metropolitan Territories) Convention, 1947
 Right to Organise and Collective Bargaining Convention, 1949
 Rural Workers' Organisations Convention, 1975
 Safety Provisions (Building) Convention, 1937
 Safety and Health in Construction Convention, 1988
 Safety and Health in Mines Convention, 1995
 Seafarers' Annual Leave with Pay Convention, 1976
 Seafarers' Hours of Work and the Manning of Ships Convention, 1996
 Seafarers' Pensions Convention, 1946
 Seafarers' Welfare Convention, 1987
 Seamen's Articles of Agreement Convention, 1926
 Sheet-Glass Works Convention, 1934 (shelved)
 Shipowners' Liability (Sick and Injured Seamen) Convention, 1936
 Sickness Insurance (Agriculture) Convention, 1927
 Sickness Insurance (Industry) Convention, 1927
 Sickness Insurance (Sea) Convention, 1936
 Social Policy (Basic Aims and Standards) Convention, 1962
 Social Policy (Non-Metropolitan Territories) Convention, 1947
 Social Security (Minimum Standards) Convention, 1952
 Social Security (Seafarers) Convention (Revised), 1987
 Social Security (Seafarers) Convention, 1946
 Survivors' Insurance (Agriculture) Convention, 1933 (shelved)
 Termination of Employment Convention, 1982
 Tripartite Consultation (International Labour Standards) Convention, 1976
 Underground Work (Women) Convention, 1935
 Unemployment Convention, 1919
 Unemployment Indemnity (Shipwreck) Convention, 1920
 Unemployment Provision Convention, 1934 (shelved)
 Vocational Rehabilitation and Employment (Disabled Persons) Convention, 1983
 Wages, Hours of Work and Manning (Sea) Convention (Revised), 1949
 Wages, Hours of Work and Manning (Sea) Convention (Revised), 1958
 Wages, Hours of Work and Manning (Sea) Convention, 1946
 Weekly Rest (Industry) Convention, 1921
 White Lead (Painting) Convention, 1921
 Workers with Family Responsibilities Convention, 1981
 Workers' Representatives Convention, 1971
 Working Environment (Air Pollution, Noise and Vibration) Convention, 1977
 Workmen's Compensation (Agriculture) Convention, 1921
 Workmen's Compensation (Accidents) Convention, 1925
 Workmen's Compensation (Occupational Diseases) Convention, 1925
 Workmen's Compensation (Occupational Diseases) Convention (Revised), 1934
 Worst Forms of Child Labour Convention, 1999

UNESCO
 UNESCO
 German Commission for UNESCO
 Arab Cultural Capital
 Carlos J. Finlay Prize for Microbiology
 Creative Cities Network
 Education for Sustainable Development
 FRESH, UNESCO
 Free Software Directory
 Geopark
 Great Apes Survival Project
 Félix Houphouët-Boigny Peace Prize
 Information for All Programme (IFAP)
 International Centre for Theoretical Physics
 International Dance Council
 International José Martí Prize
 International Music Council
 International Simón Bolívar Prize
 Kalinga Prize
 L'Oréal-UNESCO Awards for Women in Science
 MacBride report
 Madhav Das Nalapat
 René Maheu
 Masterpieces of the Oral and Intangible Heritage of Humanity
 Memory of the World Programme
 List of Permanent Delegates from New Zealand to UNESCO
 UNESCO Courier
 UNESCO Goodwill Ambassador
 UNESCO Prize for Peace Education
 UNESCO Science Prize
 UNESCO-CEPES
 UNESCO-IHE
 UNESCO/Guillermo Cano World Press Freedom Prize
 UNESCO/Institut Pasteur Medal
 Convention on the Protection and Promotion of the Diversity of Cultural Expressions
 Vittorino Veronese
 World Network of Biosphere Reserves

Biosphere reserves
 Biosphere reserve
 World Network of Biosphere Reserves
 List of Biosphere Reserves in Argentina
 List of Biosphere Reserves in Algeria
 Aleutian Islands National Wildlife Refuge
 List of Biosphere Reserves in Australia
 List of Biosphere Reserves in Austria
 List of Biosphere Reserves in Brazil
 List of Biosphere Reserves in Bolivia
 Beinn Eighe
 List of Biosphere Reserves in Belarus
 Biosphere Reserve Middle Elbe
 Bosawas Biosphere Reserve
 Braunton Burrows
 List of Biosphere Reserves in Bulgaria
 List of UNESCO Biosphere Reserves in Canada
 List of UNESCO Biosphere Reserves in China
 Calakmul Biosphere Reserve
 List of biosphere reserves in Cameroon
 Cape Lookout National Seashore
 Cascade Head
 Central Balkan National Park
 Chamela-Cuixmala Biosphere Reserve
 Chatkal National Park
 Clayoquot Sound
 List of Biosphere Reserves in Colombia
 Coram Experimental Forest
 List of Biosphere Reserves in Cuba
 Cumberland Island National Seashore
 List of Biosphere Reserves in the Czech Republic
 List of Biosphere Reserves in the Democratic Republic of the Congo
 Desert Biosphere Reserve
 List of Biosphere Reserves in Ecuador
 El Angolo Hunting enclosed land
 El Vizcaíno Biosphere Reserve
 List of Biosphere Reserves in France
 List of Biosphere Reserves in Germany
 Gluepot Reserve
 Golden Gate Biosphere Reserve
 Golija
 Maya Biosphere Reserve
 List of Biosphere Reserves in Guinea
 List of Biosphere Reserves in Hungary
 Hawaiian Islands Biosphere Reserve
 Huascarán National Park
 List of Biosphere Reserves in Indonesia
 List of Biosphere Reserves in Iran
 List of Biosphere Reserves in Israel
 List of Biosphere Reserves in Italy
 List of Biosphere Reserves in Japan
 List of Biosphere Reserves in Kenya
 Lac Saint-Pierre
 Laquipampa Reserved Zone
 Long Point
 List of Biosphere Reserves in Mexico
 Macquarie Island
 List of Biosphere Reserves in Madagascar
 Mammoth Cave National Park
 Manú National Park
 Mare aux Hippopotames
 Mojave and Colorado Deserts Biosphere Reserve
 List of Biosphere Reserves in Mongolia
 Mont Saint-Hilaire
 Mount Nimba Strict Nature Reserve
 Mulanje Massif
 National Park Sjeverni Velebit
 Natural and Cultural Peruvian Heritage
 New Jersey Pinelands Biosphere Reserve
 Niagara Escarpment
 North Bull Island
 North Vidzeme Biosphere Reserve
 Pendjari National Park
 List of Biosphere Reserves in Peru
 Queen Elizabeth National Park
 Riding Mountain National Park
 List of Biosphere Reserves in the Russian Federation
 Río Plátano Biosphere Reserve
 List of Biosphere Reserves in Spain
 Schaalsee
 List of Biosphere Reserves in Senegal
 Sian Ka'an
 Sierra Gorda
 Sinharaja Forest Reserve
 List of Biosphere Reserves in South Africa
 Spreewald
 List of Biosphere Reserves in Sri Lanka
 Sunchubamba Hunting enclosed land
 Swiss National Park
 List of Biosphere Reserves in Tunisia
 List of Biosphere Reserves in Thailand
 Thousand Islands - Frontenac Arch
 Tonlé Sap
 List of Biosphere Reserves in Ukraine
 Ulla Ulla National Reserve
 List of Biosphere Reserves in the United Kingdom
 List of Biosphere Reserves in Tanzania
 List of Biosphere Reserves in the United States
 University of Michigan Biological Station
 Unnamed Conservation Park
 Urdaibai
 Uvs Nuur
 Volcanoes National Park
 W National Park
 Waterberg Biosphere
 Waterton Lakes National Park

UNESCO Directors-General
 Audrey Azoulay
 Irina Bokova
 Luther Evans
 Julian Huxley
 René Maheu
 Koïchiro Matsuura
 Federico Mayor
 Amadou-Mahtar M'Bow
 John Wilkinson Taylor
 Jaime Torres Bodet
 Vittorino Veronese

UNESCO Nomenclature
 UNESCO Nomenclature
 4-digit UNESCO Nomenclature
 6-digit UNESCO Nomenclature

Universal Postal Union
 European Conference of Postal and Telecommunications Administrations
 Universal Postal Union
 .post
 Eugène Borel
 Express mail
 Extraterritorial Office of Exchange
 Illegal stamps
 International reply coupon
 S10 (UPU standard)
 Heinrich von Stephan

World Bank
 World Bank Group
 Operations Evaluation Department
 Annual Meetings of the International Monetary Fund and the World Bank Group
 Hedayat Arsala
 Nancy Barry
 Marek Belka
 Berg report
 Betty Oyella Bigombe
 Don Brash
 Shahid Javed Burki
 Consultative Group on International Agricultural Research
 Shelton H. Davis
 Kemal Derviş
 Luisa Diogo
 Jessica Einhorn
 Ashraf Ghani
 Glenn Hubbard (economics)
 InfoDev
 International Bank for Reconstruction and Development
 International Centre for Settlement of Investment Disputes
 International Development Association
 International Finance Corporation
 Life and Debt
 Raymond Mikesell
 Mohamed Muhsin
 Multilateral Investment Guarantee Agency
 Nicéphore Soglo
 Pearson Commission on International Development
 Moeenuddin Ahmad Qureshi
 Escott Reid
 Arun Shourie
 Singapore 2006
 United Nations Monetary and Financial Conference
 Robert Watson (scientist)
 World Bank Scholarship
 World Congress on Communication for Development

Presidents of the World Bank
 Eugene R. Black
 Alden W. Clausen
 Barber Conable
 John J. McCloy
 Robert McNamara
 Eugene Meyer
 Lewis Thompson Preston
 James Wolfensohn
 Paul Wolfowitz
 George David Woods

World Bank Chief Economists
 François Bourguignon
 Stanley Fischer
 Nicholas Stern
 Joseph E. Stiglitz
 Lawrence Summers

World Health Organization
 World Health Organization
 Bamako Initiative
 Council for International Organizations of Medical Sciences
 Department of Essential Drugs and Medicines
 Essential medicines
 WHO Framework Convention on Tobacco Control
 International Radon Project
 Uppsala Monitoring Centre
 WHO Model List of Essential Medicines
 World Health Day

Human Development Index
 Human Development Index
 List of African countries by Human Development Index
 List of China administrative divisions by HDI
 List of Latin American subnational entities by HDI
 List of Mexican states by HDI
 List of countries by Human Development Index
 List of countries by Human Development Index, 2005

History of the United Nations

League of Nations
 League of Nations
 Aga Khan III
 Åland crisis
 Allies of World War I
 American Commission to Negotiate Peace
 Article X of the Covenant of the League of Nations
 Joseph Louis Anne Avenol
 Corfu incident
 Free City of Danzig
 Albert Dufour-Feronce
 Fourteen Points
 Freedom of the seas
 Edward M. House
 Hungarian Volunteers in the Winter War
 International Law Commission
 Klaipėda Region
 Seán Lester
 Henry Cabot Lodge
 James Grover McDonald
 League of Nations members
 Nitobe Inazo
 Palais des Nations
 Paris Peace Conference, 1919
 Permanent Court of International Justice
 Eric Drummond, 7th Earl of Perth
 Nicolae Petrescu-Comnen
 Saar (League of Nations)
 Treaty of Versailles
 Woodrow Wilson
 Winter War
 World Disarmament Conference

League of Nations Mandates
 League of Nations mandate
 Cameroons
 Cameroun
 British Mandate of Mesopotamia
 French Mandate of Lebanon
 Territory of New Guinea
 British Mandate of Palestine
 Ruanda-Urundi
 South Pacific Mandate
 South-West Africa
 Southern Cameroons
 French Mandate of Syria
 Tanganyika
 British Togoland
 French Togoland
 Transjordan
 United Nations Trust Territories

Formation 

 London Declaration (1941)
 Atlantic Charter (1941)
 Declaration by United Nations (1942)
 Moscow Conference (1943)
 Tehran Conference (1943)
 Dumbarton Oaks Conference (1944)
 Yalta Conference (1945)
 Conference on International Organization (1945)

United Nations Trust Territories
 Cameroons
 Cameroun
 Territory of New Guinea
 Trust Territory of the Pacific Islands
 Ruanda-Urundi
 Italian Somaliland
 Southern Cameroons
 Tanganyika
 British Togoland
 French Togoland

United Nations peacekeeping missions and operations
 2005 July 6 United Nations assault on Cité Soleil, Haiti
 Diplomatic and humanitarian efforts in the Somali Civil War
 International Force for East Timor
 Thom Karremans
 List of United Nations peacekeeping missions
 List of countries where United Nations peacekeepers are currently deployed
 United Nations Operation in Mozambique
 Operation Sharp Guard
 Timeline of United Nations peacekeeping missions
 UNMIT
 United Nations Angola Verification Mission II
 United Nations Assistance Mission for Rwanda
 United Nations Disengagement Observer Force Zone
 United Nations Emergency Force
 United Nations Interim Force in Lebanon
 United Nations Iraq-Kuwait Observation Mission
 United Nations Mission for the Referendum in Western Sahara
 United Nations Mission in Bosnia and Herzegovina
 United Nations Mission in Ethiopia and Eritrea
 United Nations Mission in Haiti
 United Nations Mission in Liberia
 United Nations Mission in Nepal
 United Nations Mission in Sierra Leone
 United Nations Mission in Sudan
 United Nations Mission in the Democratic Republic of Congo
 United Nations Mission of Observers in Tajikistan
 United Nations Mission of Support to East Timor
 United Nations Observer Mission Uganda-Rwanda
 United Nations Observer Mission in Georgia
 United Nations Observer Mission to Verify the Referendum in Eritrea
 United Nations Office in Timor Leste
 United Nations Operation in Côte d'Ivoire
 United Nations Operation in Somalia II
 United Nations Operation in the Congo
 United Nations Peacekeeping Force in Cyprus
 United Nations Preventive Deployment Force
 United Nations Protection Force
 United Nations Stabilization Mission in Haiti
 United Nations Truce Supervision Organization

United Nations Mission in Kosovo
 Camp Bondsteel
 Kosovo Force
 Bernard Kouchner
 United Nations Interim Administration Mission in Kosovo

United Nations General Assembly Resolutions

 United Nations General Assembly Resolution
 UN General Assembly Resolution 194
 UN General Assembly Resolution 273
 UN General Assembly Resolution 377 A
 UN General Assembly Resolution 505
 UN General Assembly Resolution 1761
 UN General Assembly Resolution 2758
 UN General Assembly Resolution 3379
 UN General Assembly Resolution 4686
 1947 UN Partition Plan
 UN General Assembly Resolution 3236
 Declaration on the Granting of Independence to Colonial Countries and Peoples
 List of United Nations resolutions relating to Lebanon
 UN General Assembly Resolution 1668
 UN General Assembly Resolution 1962
 United Nations Convention against Corruption
 United Nations General Assembly Resolution 37/37
 United Nations resolutions on Abkhazia
 Universal Declaration of Human Rights
 List of United Nations Security Council resolutions concerning Iraq

United Nations Security Council Resolutions
 United Nations Security Council Resolution
 List of United Nations Security Council Resolutions 1 to 100
 List of United Nations Security Council Resolutions 101 to 200
 List of United Nations Security Council Resolutions 201 to 300
 List of United Nations Security Council Resolutions 301 to 400
 List of United Nations Security Council Resolutions 401 to 500
 List of United Nations Security Council Resolutions 501 to 600
 List of United Nations Security Council Resolutions 601 to 700
 List of United Nations Security Council Resolutions 701 to 800
 List of United Nations Security Council Resolutions 801 to 900
 List of United Nations Security Council Resolutions 1001 to 1100
 List of United Nations Security Council Resolutions 1101 to 1200
 List of United Nations Security Council Resolutions 1201 to 1300
 List of United Nations Security Council Resolutions 1301 to 1400
 List of United Nations Security Council Resolutions 1401 to 1500
 List of United Nations Security Council Resolutions 1501 to 1600
 List of United Nations Security Council Resolutions 1601 to 1700
 List of United Nations Security Council Resolutions 1701 to 1800
 United Nations Security Council Resolution 1
 United Nations Security Council Resolution 2
 United Nations Security Council Resolution 3
 United Nations Security Council Resolution 4
 United Nations Security Council Resolution 5
 United Nations Security Council Resolution 6
 United Nations Security Council Resolution 7
 United Nations Security Council Resolution 8
 United Nations Security Council Resolution 9
 United Nations Security Council Resolution 10
 United Nations Security Council Resolution 11
 United Nations Security Council Resolution 12
 United Nations Security Council Resolution 13
 United Nations Security Council Resolution 14
 United Nations Security Council Resolution 15
 United Nations Security Council Resolution 16
 United Nations Security Council Resolution 17
 United Nations Security Council Resolution 18
 United Nations Security Council Resolution 19
 United Nations Security Council Resolution 20
 United Nations Security Council Resolution 21
 United Nations Security Council Resolution 22
 United Nations Security Council Resolution 23
 United Nations Security Council Resolution 24
 United Nations Security Council Resolution 25
 United Nations Security Council Resolution 26
 United Nations Security Council Resolution 27
 United Nations Security Council Resolution 28
 United Nations Security Council Resolution 29
 United Nations Security Council Resolution 30
 United Nations Security Council Resolution 31
 United Nations Security Council Resolution 32
 United Nations Security Council Resolution 33
 United Nations Security Council Resolution 34
 United Nations Security Council Resolution 35
 United Nations Security Council Resolution 36
 United Nations Security Council Resolution 38
 United Nations Security Council Resolution 39
 United Nations Security Council Resolution 40
 United Nations Security Council Resolution 41
 United Nations Security Council Resolution 42
 United Nations Security Council Resolution 43
 United Nations Security Council Resolution 44
 United Nations Security Council Resolution 45
 United Nations Security Council Resolution 46
 United Nations Security Council Resolution 47
 United Nations Security Council Resolution 48
 United Nations Security Council Resolution 49
 United Nations Security Council Resolution 50
 United Nations Security Council Resolution 85
 United Nations Security Council Resolution 241
 United Nations Security Council Resolution 242
 United Nations Security Council Resolution 267
 United Nations Security Council Resolution 338
 United Nations Security Council Resolution 339
 United Nations Security Council Resolution 350
 United Nations Security Council Resolution 446
 United Nations Security Council Resolution 452
 United Nations Security Council Resolution 465
 United Nations Security Council Resolution 471
 United Nations Security Council Resolution 478
 United Nations Security Council Resolution 487
 United Nations Security Council Resolution 497
 United Nations Security Council Resolution 660
 United Nations Security Council Resolution 661
 United Nations Security Council Resolution 678
 United Nations Security Council Resolution 687
 United Nations Security Council Resolution 794
 United Nations Security Council Resolution 837
 United Nations Security Council Resolution 940
 United Nations Security Council Resolution 986
 United Nations Security Council Resolution 1111
 United Nations Security Council Resolution 1284
 United Nations Security Council Resolution 1373
 United Nations Security Council Resolution 1679
 UN Resolutions relating to Cyprus

2002 United Nations Security Council Resolutions
 United Nations Security Council Resolution 1422
 United Nations Security Council Resolution 1441

2003 United Nations Security Council Resolutions
 United Nations Security Council Resolution 1483
 United Nations Security Council Resolution 1495

2004 United Nations Security Council Resolutions
 United Nations Security Council Resolution 1546
 United Nations Security Council Resolution 1559
 United Nations Security Council Resolution 1564
 United Nations Security Council Resolution 1566

2005 United Nations Security Council Resolutions
 United Nations Security Council Resolution 1583
 United Nations Security Council Resolution 1591
 United Nations Security Council Resolution 1612

2006 United Nations Security Council Resolutions
 United Nations Security Council Resolution 1672
 United Nations Security Council Resolution 1674
 United Nations Security Council Resolution 1675
 United Nations Security Council Resolution 1680
 United Nations Security Council Resolution 1695
 United Nations Security Council Resolution 1696
 United Nations Security Council Resolution 1697
 United Nations Security Council Resolution 1700
 United Nations Security Council Resolution 1701
 United Nations Security Council Resolution 1704
 United Nations Security Council Resolution 1706
 United Nations Security Council Resolution 1718
 United Nations Security Council Resolution 1720
 United Nations Security Council Resolution 1737

United Nations reform
 Binding Triad
 Committee for a Democratic UN
 Reform of the United Nations
 Reform of the United Nations Security Council
 Sovereignty of the UN Organization

United Nations Parliamentary Assembly
 Citizens for a United Nations People's Assembly
 Committee for a Democratic UN
 International Network for a United Nations Second Assembly
 Provisional People's Assembly
 United Nations Parliamentary Assembly

United Nations relations
 Armenia and the United Nations
 Australia and the United Nations
 Canada and the United Nations
 China and the United Nations
 Israel and the United Nations
 Japan and the United Nations
 Soviet Union and the United Nations
 United Kingdom and the United Nations
 United States and the United Nations

United Nations tribunals
 International Criminal Tribunal for Rwanda
 International Criminal Tribunal for the former Yugoslavia
 Special Court for Sierra Leone

International Criminal Tribunal for Rwanda
 International Criminal Tribunal for Rwanda
 Carla Del Ponte
 Adama Dieng
 Callixte Gakwaya

International Criminal Tribunal for Rwanda judges
 Khalida Rachid Khan
 Li Haopei
 Theodor Meron
 Erik Møse
 Fausto Pocar
 Jai Ram Reddy
 Wolfgang Schomburg
 Inés Mónica Weinberg de Roca

People charged by the International Criminal Tribunal for Rwanda
 Théoneste Bagosora
 Jérôme Bicamumpaka
 Simon Bikindi
 Casimir Bizimungu
 Jean-Baptiste Gatete
 Idelphonse Hategekimana
 Félicien Kabuga
 Protais Mpiranya
 Idelphonse Nizeyimana
 Callixte Nzabonimana
 François-Xavier Nzuwonemeye
 Tharcisse Renzaho
 Innocent Sagahutu
 Juvénal Uwilingiyimana
 Protais Zigiranyirazo

People convicted by the International Criminal Tribunal for Rwanda
 Jean Akayesu
 Jean Kambanda
 Hassan Ngeze
 Elizaphan Ntakirutimana
 Georges Ruggiu
 Athanase Seromba

International Criminal Tribunal for the former Yugoslavia
 International Criminal Tribunal for the former Yugoslavia
 List of ICTY indictees
 Milošević trial
 Daryl A. Mundis
 Operation Storm

People charged by the International Criminal Tribunal for the former Yugoslavia

People convicted by the International Criminal Tribunal for the former Yugoslavia
 Milan Babić
 Haradin Bala
 Predrag Banović
 Vidoje Blagojević
 Tihomir Blaškić
 Dražen Erdemović
 Hazim Delić
 Goran Jelisić
 Radislav Krstić
 Dragan Nikolić (war criminal)
 Naser Orić
 Biljana Plavšić
 Duško Tadić
 Mitar Vasiljević
 Zoran Vuković
 Zoran Žigić

People indicted by the International Criminal Tribunal for the former Yugoslavia
 Rahim Ademi
 Milan Babić
 Haradin Bala
 Predrag Banović
 Vidoje Blagojević
 Tihomir Blaškić
 Janko Bobetko
 Valentin Ćorić
 Miroslav Deronjić
 Slavko Dokmanović
 Vlastimir Đorđević
 Ante Gotovina
 Goran Hadžić
 Sefer Halilović
 Ramush Haradinaj
 Goran Jelisić
 Radovan Karadžić
 Milan Kovačević
 Vladimir Kovačević
 Momčilo Krajišnik
 Radislav Krstić
 Fatmir Limaj
 Milan Martić
 Dragomir Milošević
 Slobodan Milošević
 Milan Milutinović
 Ratko Mladić
 Mile Mrkšić
 Agim Murtezi
 Isak Musliu
 Mirko Norac
 Dragan Obrenović
 Momčilo Perišić
 Milivoj Petković
 Biljana Plavšić
 Slobodan Praljak
 Jadranko Prlić
 Željko Ražnatović
 Vojislav Šešelj
 Duško Sikirica
 Milomir Stakić
 Bruno Stojić
 Duško Tadić
 Momir Talić
 Zdravko Tolimir
 Mitar Vasiljević
 Zoran Vuković
 Zoran Žigić
 Stojan Župljanin
 Veselin Šljivančanin

United Nations Oil-for-Food scandal
 Oil-for-Food Programme
 Kofi Annan
 Benon Sevan
 David B. Chalmers
 Norm Coleman
 George Galloway
 Paul Volcker

United Nations in education

United Nations schools
 International School of Geneva
 United Nations International School of Hanoi
 United Nations International School
 University for Peace
 Vienna International School

Model United Nations
 Model United Nations
 Harvard National Model United Nations
 WorldMUN

United Nations observances
The United Nations observances are days, weeks, months, years and decades where issues that are important for humanity are brought to the attention and given a forum. In several of the resolutions where the decision has been taken for a particular observance, it is mentioned that the observance has to be taken up in the educational curriculum, and often as well that the member organisations to the UN are supposed to make a budget available and feedback an agenda of planned activities and a report of those. Some of the observances are a very hot item to some members and much maneuvering is done to limit the impact and resources that go to the observance. The UN Decade for people of African descent reporting for the EU-28 has e.g. fallen under the responsibility of the Belgian delegation to the UN; Belgium being one of Africa's eight former colonial powers.

 International observance
 World AIDS Day
 International Day for Biological Diversity
 International Dance Day
 International Year of Deserts and Desertification
 International Day of Disabled Persons
 Year of the Dolphin
 World Creativity and Innovation Day
 Earth Day
 International Day for the Elimination of Violence against Women
 World Environment Day
 International Holocaust Remembrance Day
 Human Rights Day
 International Day for the Eradication of Poverty
 International Year of Disabled Persons
 International Year of the Child
 International Year of the Potato
 International Literacy Day
 International Year of Microcredit
 International Mother Language Day
 World No Tobacco Day
 International Year of Older Persons
 International Day of Peace
 World Year of Physics 2005
 International Year of Planet Earth
 World Press Freedom Day
 International Day of Solidarity with the Palestinian People
 International Year to Commemorate the Struggle against Slavery and its Abolition
 World Television Day
 International Day for Tolerance
 United Nations Year for Tolerance
 World Tourism Day
 World Tuberculosis Day
 United Nations Day
 World Day for Water
 International Women's Day
 World Book and Copyright Day
 World Food Day
 World Health Day
 World Intellectual Property Day
 World Poetry Day
 World Teachers' Day
 International Youth Day
 International Youth Year

UNESCO designations

World Heritage Sites
 World Heritage Site
 List of World Heritage Sites in Africa
 List of World Heritage Sites in the Americas
 List of World Heritage in Danger
 Aapravasi Ghat
 Angkor
 List of World Heritage Sites in Asia and Australasia
 Belize Barrier Reef
 Brimstone Hill Fortress National Park
 Cocora Valley
 List of World Heritage Sites in Europe
 Henderson Island (Pitcairn Islands)
 Ilulissat
 Joya de Cerén
 Mausoleum of Khoja Ahmed Yasavi
 Morne Trois Pitons National Park
 Mostar
 Ohrid
 Organization of World Heritage Cities
 Riversleigh
 Rock cut architecture
 Škocjan Caves
 Tamgaly
 Template:Infobox World Heritage Site
 Vatican City
 Willemstad
 World Heritage Site
 Table of World Heritage Sites based on State Parties

World Book Capitals
 World Book Capital
 Amsterdam
 Antwerp
 Bogotá
 Madrid
 Montreal

Recipients of the Félix Houphouët-Boigny Peace Prize
 Félix Houphouët-Boigny Peace Prize
 Yasser Arafat
 Álvaro Arzú
 Jimmy Carter
 Mustafa Ef. Ceric
 Community of Sant'Egidio
 Frederik Willem de Klerk
 Roger Etchegaray
 Xanana Gusmão
 Hague Academy of International Law
 Sheikh Hasina
 Juan Carlos I of Spain
 Nelson Mandela
 George J. Mitchell
 Rolando Morán
 Sadako Ogata
 Shimon Peres
 Yitzhak Rabin
 Fidel V. Ramos
 Mary Robinson
 Abdoulaye Wade

L’Oréal-UNESCO Awards for Women in Science laureates
 L’Oréal-UNESCO Awards for Women in Science
 Anne McLaren
 Shirley M. Tilghman
 Mayana Zatz

Masterpieces of the Oral and Intangible Heritage of Humanity
 Masterpieces of the Oral and Intangible Heritage of Humanity
 Aka (Pygmy tribe)
 Akyn
 Ath
 Barranquilla's Carnival
 Baul
 Căluşari
 Day of the Dead
 Djemaa el Fna
 Duduk
 Gelede
 Guqin
 Jongmyo
 Kabuki
 Koodiyattam
 Kris
 Kunqu
 Lakalaka
 Maqam
 Mons
 Morin khuur
 Mukamlar
 Mystery Play of Elx
 Pansori
 Taghribat Bani Hilal
 Vedas
 Wayang

United Nations people
 Abdennour Abrous
 Shirin Ameeruddy-Cziffra
 Brigitte Andreassier-Pearl
 Michael Bailey
 Jacques-Roger Booh-Booh
 Peter R. Harris
 Igor Korchilov
 Jesús Baigorri Jalón
 Ahmad Kamal
 Vladimir Kuznetsov (diplomat)
 Anna Di Lellio
 Tuan-Li Diana Liao
 Juan E. Méndez
 Pavel Palazhchenko
 Eleanor Roosevelt
 Jomo Kwame Sundaram

United Nations officials
 Prince Sadruddin Aga Khan
 Brigitte Andreassier-Pearl
 Antonio Castro Leal
 Louise Arbour
 Alicia Bárcena Ibarra
 Carol Bellamy
 Gro Harlem Brundtland
 Gerald Caplan
 Andrew W. Cordier
 António Costa
 United Nations Deputy Secretary-General
 Kemal Derviş
 Ahmed Djoghlaf
 Charles A. Duelfer
 Jan Egeland
 Mohamed ElBaradei
 Ibrahim Gambari
 Bettina Goislard
 Rajat Gupta
 Denis Halliday
 Peter Hansen (UN)
 Dick Heyward
 John Peters Humphrey
 Razali Ismail
 Robert Gillman Allen Jackson
 Jesús Baigorri Jalón
 Jean-Sélim Kanaan
 Mukesh Kapila
 Karl Theodor Paschke
 Salem Hanna Khamis
 Karen Koning AbuZayd
 Igor Korchilov
 Bernard Kouchner
 John Langmore
 Joseph Legwaila
 Stephen Lewis
 Tuan-Li Diana Liao
 List of ambassadors to the United Nations
 José Luis Machinea
 Andrew MacLeod
 Mark Malloch Brown
 Maimunah Mohd Sharif
 Ad Melkert
 Sérgio Vieira de Mello
 Michèle Montas
 Asha-Rose Migiro
 Chandran Nair
 Thoraya Obaid
 Francis Martin O'Donnell
 Palamadai S. Lokanathan
 Pavel Palazhchenko
 Peter Piot
 Jan Pronk
 Ashraf Qazi
 Bertrand Ramcharan
 Delphine Red Shirt
 Mary Robinson
 Terje Rød-Larsen
 Jeffrey Sachs
 Nafis Sadik
 Rafael M. Salas
 John A. Scali
 Arkady Shevchenko
 Shi Jiuyong
 Sigvard Eklund
 Special Representative of the Secretary General
 Achim Steiner
 Thorvald Stoltenberg
 Maurice Strong
 Malcolm Templeton
 Thant Myint-U
 Shashi Tharoor
 Anna Tibaijuka
 Klaus Töpfer
 Danilo Türk
 Under-Secretary-General of the United Nations
 Ann Veneman
 Vijay K. Nambiar
 Joke Waller-Hunter
 Fiona Watson
 Alexander Yakovlev (UN)
 Nadia Younes

Ambassadors to the United Nations
 List of ambassadors to the United Nations
 Permanent Representative
 Mahamat Ali Adoum
 Yaşar Aliyev
 Tawfeeq Ahmed Almansoor
 Araya Desta
 Francisco Arias Cárdenas
 Ricardo Alberto Arias
 John William Ashe
 Aksoltan Ataýewa
 Lauro L. Baja, Jr.
 Rosemary Banks
 Enrique Berruga
 Paulette Bethel
 Jérémie Bonnelame
 Francis K. Butagira
 Canadian ambassadors to the United Nations
 Carmen Maria Gallardo Hernandez
 Chem Widhya
 Iftekhar Ahmed Chowdhury
 Julian Vila Coma
 David J. Cooney
 Andrei Dapkiunas
 Pierson Dixon
 Igor Džundev
 Martin Belinga Eboutou
 Nana Effah-Apenteng
 Ravan A. G. Farhâdi
 Joseph Nanven Garba
 Dan Gillerman
 Christopher Fitzherbert Hackett
 Robert Hill (Australian politician)
 Julian Hunte
 Simon Idohou
 Baki İlkin
 Samuel Insanally
 Michel Kafando
 Yerzhan Kazykhanov
 Roman Kirn
 Jean-Marc de La Sablière
 Mohamed Latheef (ambassador)
 Anders Lidén
 Kirsti Lintonen
 Ellen Margrethe Løj
 Augustine P. Mahiga
 Adam Malik
 Gaspar Martins
 Armen Martirosyan
 César Mayoral
 John McNee (diplomat)
 Celestino Migliore
 Heraldo Muñoz
 Adrian Neritani
 List of Permanent Representatives from New Zealand to the United Nations in New York
 List of Permanent Representatives from New Zealand to the United Nations in Geneva
 List of Permanent Representatives from New Zealand to the United Nations in Vienna
 Kenzo Oshima
 Samuel O. Outlule
 Pak Kil-yon
 Arvid Pardo
 Emyr Jones Parry
 David Peleg
 Joe Robert Pemagbi
 Daw Penjo
 Gerhard Pfanzelter
 Gunter Pleuger
 Miloš Prica
 Ronaldo Mota Sardenberg
 Isikia Savua
 Philip Sealy
 Nirupam Sen
 Anthony Severin
 Mohamed El-Amine Souef
 Marcello Spatafora
 Andrzej Towpik
 List of Permanent Representatives from the United Kingdom to the United Nations in New York
 United States Ambassador to the United Nations
 Johan C. Verbeke
 Wang Guangya
 Nugroho Wisnumurti
 Youcef Yousfi
 M. Javad Zarif
 Zeid Ra’ad Zeid Al-Hussein

List of Australian ambassadors to the United Nations

List of Australian ambassadors to the United Nations

Former British Ambassadors to the United Nations
 Alexander Cadogan
 Hugh Foot, Baron Caradon
 Gladwyn Jebb, 1st Baron Gladwyn
 Jeremy Greenstock
 David Hannay, Baron Hannay of Chiswick
 Ivor Richard, Baron Richard
 Crispin Tickell
 John Weston

Former Canadian Ambassadors to the United Nations
 See complete list of former Canadian ambassadors to the United Nations

Former Israeli Ambassadors to the United Nations
 Abba Eban
 Chaim Herzog
 Benjamin Netanyahu

Former Russian and Soviet Ambassadors to the United Nations
 Vitaly Churkin
 Andrey Denisov
 Sergey Lavrov

United States ambassadors to the United Nations
 United States Ambassador to the United Nations
 Madeleine Albright
 John R. Bolton
 John Danforth
 Jeane Kirkpatrick
 Bill Richardson

FAO experts
 John Boyd Orr, 1st Baron Boyd-Orr
 René Dumont
 Mordecai Ezekiel
 Salem Hanna Khamis
 Chandrika Kumaratunga
 Jan Mulder
 Binay Ranjan Sen
 Mahmoud Solh
 Edward Szczepanik
 Togba-Nah Tipoteh
 Metha Wanapat

Presidents of the United Nations General Assembly
 Haya Rashed Al-Khalifa
 Oswaldo Aranha
 José Arce
 Emilio Arenales Catalán
 Víctor Andrés Belaúnde
 Frederick Boland
 Abdelaziz Bouteflika
 Angie Elisabeth Brooks
 Guido de Marco
 Jan Eliasson
 Amara Essy
 H. V. Evatt
 Amintore Fanfani
 Diogo Freitas do Amaral
 Joseph Nanven Garba
 Theo-Ben Gurirab
 Edvard Hambro
 Harri Holkeri
 Imre Hollai
 Julian Hunte
 Jorge Illueca
 Samuel Insanally
 Razali Ismail
 Jan Kavan
 Muhammad Zafrulla Khan
 Ismat T. Kittani
 Eelco van Kleffens
 Adam Malik
 Charles Malik
 Corneliu Mănescu
 Lazar Mojsov
 Leslie Munro
 Didier Opertti
 Vijaya Lakshmi Pandit
 Abdul Rahman Pazhwak
 Lester B. Pearson
 Jean Ping
 Alex Quaison-Sackey
 Carlos P. Romulo
 Salim Ahmed Salim
 Han Seung Soo
 Mongi Slim
 Paul-Henri Spaak
 Gaston Thorn
 Wan Waithayakon
 Rüdiger von Wechmar

United Nations Secretaries-General
 Secretary-General of the United Nations
 Kofi Annan
 Ban Ki-moon
 Boutros Boutros-Ghali
 Gladwyn Jebb, 1st Baron Gladwyn
 Dag Hammarskjöld
 Trygve Lie
 Javier Pérez de Cuéllar
 U Thant
 United Nations
 Kurt Waldheim

World Health Organization officials
 Kazem Behbehani
 Gro Harlem Brundtland
 Marcolino Gomes Candau
 Margaret Chan
 Kevin De Cock
 Arata Kochi
 Lee Jong-wook
 Halfdan T. Mahler
 Jonathan Mann
 Pascoal Mocumbi
 David Nabarro
 Hiroshi Nakajima
 Anders Nordström
 Mario Raviglione
 Carlo Urbani

Special Rapporteurs to the United Nations
 United Nations Special Rapporteur
 Asma Jahangir
 Leandro Despouy
 John Dugard
 Hina Jilani
 Paul Hunt
 Manfred Nowak
 Nigel S. Rodley
 Okechukwu Ibeanu
 Rodolfo Stavenhagen
 John Ruggie
 Sima Samar
 Special Rapporteur on the sale of children, child prostitution and child pornography
 Katarina Tomasevski
 Jean Ziegler

United Nations Interpreters
 Brigitte Andreassier-Pearl
 Jesús Baigorri Jalón
 Igor Korchilov
 Tuan-Li Diana Liao
 Pavel Palazhchenko

United Nations experts
 Andrea Rossi (economist)

See also 

 1996 shelling of Qana
 2005 World Summit
 2006 United Nations Security Council election
 2010 Biodiversity Target
 2010 Biodiversity Indicators Partnership
 Agenda 21
 Aggression (war crime)
 Amendments to the United Nations Charter
 Article 12
 Arusha Accords
 Asia Society
 Asia-Pacific Development Information Programme
 Asian Highway Network
 Attacks on United Nations personnel during the 2006 Israel-Lebanon conflict
 Marc Bélanger
 Biosafety Clearing-House
 Bluewash
 British Mandate of Palestine
 Broad Economic Categories
 Brundtland Commission
 Ralph Bunche Park
 CIFAL
 Canal Hotel Bombing
 Cartagena Protocol on Biosafety
 Central Emergency Response Fund
 Centre for Social Development and Humanitarian Affairs
 Chapter VII of the United Nations Charter
 Anwarul Karim Chowdhury
 Commission on Global Governance
 Committee on the Rights of the Child
 Compass Group
 Conference on Disarmament
 Consultative Status
 Convention on Biological Diversity
 Convention on Environmental Impact Assessment in a Transboundary Context
 Convention on the Elimination of All Forms of Discrimination Against Women
 Convention on the Elimination of All Forms of Racial Discrimination
 Convention on the Recognition and Enforcement of Foreign Arbitral Awards
 Convention on the Rights of the Child
 United Nations Correspondents Association
 Dag Hammarskjöld Library
 Decade for the Promotion of a Culture of Peace and Non-Violence for the Children of the World
 Declaration by United Nations
 Democratic deficit
 Diplomatic and humanitarian efforts in the Somali Civil War
 Peggy Dulany
 Earth Charter
 Economic and Finance Committee
 Emergency Sex and Other Desperate Measures
 Enlargement of the United Nations
 Eurest Support Services
 Facts for Life
 Fiji Mission to the United Nations
 Flag of the United Nations
 Forest Principles
 Fourth World Conference on Women
 Freedom of religion
 G4 nations
 General Conference
 UN Global Compact
 The Global Fund to Fight AIDS, Tuberculosis & Malaria
 Global Policy Forum
 Group of 77
 Habitat II
 High Level Threat Panel
 History of the United Nations
 Sub-Commission on the Promotion and Protection of Human Rights
 Human Rights Committee
 IDNDR
 IRIN
 Icara 2
 International Conference on Population and Development
 International Court of Justice Advisory Opinion on Western Sahara
 International Covenant on Economic, Social and Cultural Rights
 International Early Warning Programme
 International response to the Second Chechen War
 The Interpreter
 Iraq sanctions
 JACKSNNZ
 Japanese Peace Bell
 René de Labarrière
 Stuart Leslie
 List of UN Numbers
 List of UN Numbers 0001 to 0100
 List of UN Numbers 0101 to 0200
 List of UN Numbers 0201 to 0300
 List of UN Numbers 0301 to 0400
 List of UN Numbers 0401 to 0500
 List of UN Numbers 1001 to 1100
 List of UN Numbers 1101 to 1200
 List of UN Numbers 1201 to 1300
 List of UN Numbers 1401 to 1500
 List of UN Numbers 1501 to 1600
 List of UN Numbers 1601 to 1700
 List of UN Numbers 1701 to 1800
 List of UN Numbers 1801 to 1900
 List of UN Numbers 1901 to 2000
 List of UN Numbers 2001 to 2100
 List of UN Numbers 2101 to 2200
 List of UN Numbers 2201 to 2300
 List of UN Numbers 2301 to 2400
 List of UN Numbers 2401 to 2500
 List of UN Numbers 2501 to 2600
 List of UN Numbers 2601 to 2700
 List of UN Numbers 2701 to 2800
 List of UN Numbers 2801 to 2900
 List of UN Numbers 2901 to 3000
 List of UN Numbers 3001 to 3100
 List of UN Numbers 3101 to 3200
 List of UN Numbers 3201 to 3300
 List of UN Numbers 3301 to 3400
 List of United Nations peacekeeping missions
 List of countries where United Nations peacekeepers are currently deployed
 List of elected members of the United Nations Security Council
 List of the UN resolutions concerning Israel
 MONEE Project
 Mbaye Diagne
 Microcredit
 Millennium Development Goals
 Millennium Summit
 Monterrey Consensus
 Multiple Indicator Cluster Survey
 Music for UNICEF Concert
 National Action Plan for Children
 Negroponte doctrine
 New World Information and Communication Order
 Office of the United Nations High Commissioner for Human Rights
 Operation Orient Express
 Our Global Neighborhood
 PARIS21
 Palais Wilson
 Paul Volcker Committee
 Peacekeeping
 Peacekeeping: Latin American participation
 Philippine Refugee Processing Center
 President of the United Nations General Assembly
 Progress Report of the United Nations Mediator on Palestine
 Protocol to Prevent, Suppress and Punish Trafficking in Persons, especially Women and Children
 Quartet on the Middle East
 Refugee Day
 Report of the Panel on United Nations Peacekeeping
 United Nations resolution
 Rio Declaration on Environment and Development
 Rockefeller Brothers Fund
 Rockefeller Foundation
 Rockefeller family
 David Rockefeller
 John D. Rockefeller, Jr.
 Russia's membership in the United Nations
 United Nations Security Council veto power
 U.S. Committee for the United Nations Development Program
 Seventh emergency special session of the United Nations General Assembly
 Spying on the United Nations
 Standby High-Readiness Brigade
 Stateless person
 Talk:Peacekeeping/Archive
 Ten Threats
 Tenth emergency special session of the United Nations General Assembly
 The Book of Aspirations
 Transnational Organized Crime
 Abibatou Traoré
 UN Administrator for East Timor
 UN ICT Task Force
 UN Regional Groups
 UN Holocaust Memorial
 UN number
 UN-Energy
 UN-Water
 UNMO
 UNPAN
 UNYA
 Undersecretary-General for Humanitarian Affairs and Emergency Relief Coordinator
 Robert A. Rubinstein
 United Nations 1956 Supplementary Convention on the Abolition of Slavery
 United Nations Association
 United Nations Association UK
 United Nations Association of the United States of America
 United Nations Buffer Zone in Cyprus
 United Nations Car Free Days
 United Nations Charter
 United Nations Command (Korea)
 United Nations Commission on the Status of Women
 United Nations Compensation Commission
 United Nations Conciliation Commission
 United Nations Conference on the Illicit Trade in Small Arms
 United Nations Conference on the Standardization of Geographical Names
 United Nations Confidence Restoration Operation
 United Nations Convention against Corruption
 United Nations Convention on Contracts for the International Sale of Goods
 United Nations Decade of Education for Sustainable Development
 United Nations Democracy Fund
 United Nations Development Corporation
 United Nations Division for Palestinian Rights
 United Nations Economic Commission for Europe
 United Nations Economic Commission for Latin America and the Caribbean
 United Nations Economic and Social Commission for Asia and the Pacific
 United Nations Economic and Social Commission for Western Asia
 United Nations Economic and Social Council
 United Nations General Assembly
 United Nations General Assembly Resolution
 United Nations General Assembly observers
 United Nations Girls' Education Initiative
 United Nations Good Offices Mission in Afghanistan and Pakistan
 United Nations Humanitarian Air Service
 United Nations Humanitarian Response Depot
 United Nations in popular culture
 United Nations Institute for Training and Research
 United Nations Interim Force in Lebanon
 United Nations Interregional Crime and Justice Research Institute
 United Nations Medal
 United Nations Memorial Cemetery
 United Nations Millennium Declaration
 United Nations Millennium Project
 United Nations Office of Internal Oversight Services
 United Nations Participation Act
 United Nations Peace Messenger Cities
 United Nations Postal Administration
 United Nations Prize in the Field of Human Rights
 United Nations Radio
 United Nations Safe Areas
 United Nations Security Council Committee 1267
 UN Security Council Resolution 1325
 United Nations Service Medal
 United Nations Sixth Committee on Aggression
 United Nations Society of Writers
 United Nations Special Committee on Palestine
 United Nations Stabilization Mission in Haiti
 United Nations System of National Accounts
 United Nations Transitional Administration for Eastern Slavonia, Baranja and Western Sirmium
 United Nations Treaty Series
 United Nations Trusteeship Council
 United Nations Yemen Observation Mission
 United Nations Youth Association of Australia
 United Nations geoscheme
 United Nations geoscheme for Africa
 United Nations geoscheme for the Americas
 United Nations geoscheme for Asia
 United Nations geoscheme for Europe
 United Nations geoscheme for Oceania
 United Nations headquarters
 United Nations list of non-self-governing territories
 United Nations member states
 United Nations visiting mission to Spanish Sahara
 Vienna International Centre
 WAIPA
 Wendy Chamberlin
 Western European and Others Group
 Withdrawal from the United Nations
 Working Group on Indigenous Populations
 World Chronicle
 World Conference on Disaster Reduction
 World Federation of United Nations Associations
 World Peace Through World Law
 Template:UN Charter

References

External links 

 Directory of the UN system
 List of main UN System bodies
 Chart of main UN System bodies
 UN System Sites
 Global Issues on the UN Agenda
 UN System – CEB (Chief Executives Board)
 UN – Senior Management Group
 United Nations – Official site

United Nations
United Nations